Murad Aghakishiyev (born 13 June 1985) is a football midfielder from Azerbaijan.

Career

Club
Aghakishiyev started his career with Shafa Baku, before moving to MOIK Baku, FK MKT Araz, Qarabağ, FK Karvan, Standard Sumgayit and FC Absheron before joining Turan Tovuz.

International
Aghakishiyev debuted for the national team in 2007.

Career statistics

International

Statistics accurate as of match played 22 August 2007

Honours
Absheron
Azerbaijan First Division (1): 2010–11
Neftchala
Azerbaijan First Division (1): 2014–15

References

External links

qarabagh.com

1985 births
Azerbaijani footballers
Azerbaijan international footballers
Living people
Kapaz PFK players
FK MKT Araz players

Association football midfielders